Daniel Pearl (October 10, 1963 – February 1, 2002) was an American journalist who worked for The Wall Street Journal. He was kidnapped from the home of fellow journalist Asra Nomani, and later decapitated by terrorists in Pakistan.

Pearl was born in Princeton, New Jersey, and raised in Encino, Los Angeles, to a Jewish family of mixed European and West Asian origins; his father is of Polish Jewish descent and his mother was an Iraqi Jew from Baghdad. After obtaining his Bachelor of Arts in communication from Stanford University, Pearl embarked on a career in journalism. He was working as the South Asia Bureau Chief of The Wall Street Journal, based in Mumbai, India. He was kidnapped by Islamist militants when he went to Pakistan as part of an investigation into the alleged links between British citizen Richard Reid (known as the "shoe bomber") and al-Qaeda. Pearl was beheaded and his death filmed by his captors.

Ahmed Omar Saeed Sheikh, a British national of Pakistani origin, was sentenced to death by hanging for Pearl's abduction and murder in 2002, but his conviction for murder was overturned by a Pakistani court in the summer of 2020.

Early life and education
Pearl was born in Princeton, New Jersey, to Judea and Ruth Pearl (née Rejwan). His father is an Israeli-American of Polish Jewish descent and his mother was an Iraqi Jew whose family was saved from the Farhud by Muslim neighbors. His family moved to Encino, a neighborhood in the City of Los Angeles, when his father took a position with the University of California, Los Angeles as professor of computer science and statistics and later director of the Cognitive Systems Laboratory. In 2011, Judea Pearl received the Turing Award, the 'Nobel Prize for Computer Science'. The history of the family and its connections to Israel are described by Judea Pearl in the Los Angeles Times article, "Roots in the Holy Land".

Pearl attended Portola Junior High School and Birmingham High School.

Danny, as he was known throughout his life, attended Stanford University from 1981 to 1985, where he stood out as a Communication major with Phi Beta Kappa honors, a member of the Alpha Delta Phi fraternity, a co-founder of a student newspaper called the Stanford Commentator, as well as a reporter for the campus radio station KZSU. Pearl graduated from Stanford with a B.A. in Communication, after which he spent a summer as a Pulliam Fellow intern at The Indianapolis Star.

Journalism career

Following a trip to the Soviet Union, China and Europe, Pearl started his professional journalism career at the North Adams Transcript and The Berkshire Eagle in western Massachusetts. From there he moved to the San Francisco Business Times.

In 1990, Pearl moved to the Atlanta bureau of The Wall Street Journal and moved again in 1993 to its Washington, D.C., bureau to cover telecommunications. In 1996, he was assigned to the London bureau and in 1999 to Paris. His articles covered a range of topics, such as the October 1994 story of a Stradivarius violin allegedly found on a highway on-ramp and a June 2000 story about Iranian pop music.

He became more involved in international affairs: his most notable investigations covered the ethnic wars in the Balkans, where he discovered that charges of an alleged genocide committed in Kosovo were unsubstantiated. He also explored the American missile attack on a supposed military facility in Khartoum, which he proved to have been a pharmaceutical factory.

Marriage and family
In 1999 in Paris, Pearl met and married French journalist Mariane van Neyenhoff, a former reporter and columnist for Glamour. Their son, Adam Daniel Pearl, was born in Paris on May 28, 2002, approximately four months after Pearl's abduction and death.

South Asia and murder
The Pearls settled in Mumbai, India, after Daniel Pearl was made Southeast Asia bureau chief of The Wall Street Journal. They traveled to Karachi, Pakistan, which he used as a base for reporting on the United States' War on Terrorism following the 9/11 attacks by Al-Qaeda terrorists in 2001 in the United States.

Abduction
On January 23, 2002, on his way to what he thought was an interview with Sheikh Mubarak Ali Gilani at the Village Restaurant in downtown Karachi about terrorist Richard Reid's alleged training at one of Gilani's camps in Pakistan, Pearl was kidnapped near the Metropole Hotel at 7:00 p.m. by several Islamist jihadist groups working in collaboration. Ahmed Omar Saeed Sheikh, a member of the Harkat ul-Ansar/Harkat-ul-Mujahideen and later Jaish-e-Mohammed, has admitted to planning and committing the kidnapping but denied being involved in Pearl's murder. The beheading video of Pearl was released by Jaish-e-Mohammed, under the pseudonym of "National Movement for the Restoration of Pakistani Sovereignty" (also used in ransom emails) and Jaish member Amjad Farooqi was reportedly involved in the kidnapping and murder. In a January 2011 report prepared by the Center for Public Integrity (CPI) and the International Consortium of Investigative Journalists (ICIJ), members of other Pakistani terrorist groups such as Harkat-ul-Jihad al-Islami and Sipah-e-Sahaba Pakistan were also stated to be involved in Pearl's kidnapping and murder. The lead author of the report was Pearl's friend and colleague in Pakistan, journalist Asra Nomani. All of the aforementioned groups were operating under the Lashkar-e-Omar umbrella. Al-Qaeda leaders were also involved in the kidnapping and murder of Pearl, with Saif al-Adel playing a role in organizing the kidnapping and Khalid Sheikh Mohammed was personally identified in investigative reports as the one who killed Pearl. Pearl was detained and later killed at an Al-Qaeda safe house in Karachi owned by Pakistani businessman Saud Memon. Matiur Rehman, another al-Qaeda leader has been identified as being involved in the kidnapping.

The militants claimed Pearl was a spy and—using a Hotmail e-mail address—sent the United States a range of demands, including the freeing of all Pakistani terror detainees, and the release of a halted U.S. shipment of F-16 fighter jets to the Pakistani government.

The message read:
We give you one more day if America will not meet our demands we will kill Daniel. Then this cycle will continue and no American journalist could enter Pakistan.

Photos of Pearl handcuffed with a gun at his head and holding up a newspaper were attached. The group did not respond to public pleas for release of the journalist by his editor and his wife Mariane. United States intelligence forces tried to track down the kidnappers.

Death
Nine days later, the terrorists beheaded Pearl. When the police found Pearl's remains three months after his murder, Abdul Sattar Edhi, a Pakistani philanthropist, collected all of the body parts and took them to the morgue. He helped ensure that Pearl's remains were returned to the United States, where he was later interred in the Mount Sinai Memorial Park Cemetery in Los Angeles.

Video of his murder

On February 21, 2002, a video was released titled The Slaughter of the Spy-Journalist, the Jew Daniel Pearl. The video shows Pearl's mutilated body, and lasts 3 minutes and 36 seconds.

During the video, Pearl said:

My name is Daniel Pearl. I'm a Jewish-American from Encino, California, USA. I come from, uh, on my father's side the family is Zionist. My father's Jewish, my mother's Jewish, I'm Jewish. My family follows Judaism. We've made numerous family visits to Israel.

Pearl condemned American foreign policy in the video. His family stated that he did so under duress, describing him as "a proud American, and he abhorred extremist ideologies". They also said that he gave signals that indicated that he did not agree with what he was saying. Following these statements, Pearl's throat was slit, and his head was severed.

The video was released under the name of the "National Movement for the Restoration of Pakistani Sovereignty", a pseudonym of the Jaish-e-Mohammed, with the captors repeating their earlier emailed demands for the release of all Muslim prisoners in Guantanamo Bay and repatriation of all Pakistani nationals detained by the US, the end of US presence in Pakistan and the delivery of F-16 fighter planes paid for by Pakistan in the 1980s but not delivered at the time. It concluded by vowing similar attacks on Americans in Pakistan in the future. They warned that, if their demands were not met, they would repeat such a beheading "again and again".

Murder-investigation

Arrests
Three suspects were caught by February 6, 2002, after the IP address of those who sent the ransom e-mail was traced by police in Karachi. The arrests were carried out after investigation by Pakistani detective Mir Zubair Mahmood, assisted by an FBI computer expert. The man responsible for the planning and execution of the kidnapping, Ahmed Omar Saeed Sheikh, surrendered to a former ISI officer, Brig. Ijaz Shah, who concealed Sheikh's whereabouts from the Karachi police for a week. Sheikh had been in an Indian prison in connection with 1994 kidnappings of Western tourists in India. In December 1999, Sheikh was released by the Indian government in exchange for the safe release of passengers aboard hijacked Indian Airlines Flight 814.

On March 21, 2002, in Pakistan, Ahmed Omar Saeed Sheikh and three other suspects were charged with murder for their part in the kidnapping and murder of Daniel Pearl. They were convicted on July 15, 2002, and Sheikh was sentenced to death. Sheikh has appealed the sentence. On April 2, 2020, Sheikh's murder conviction was overturned by a Pakistani court, and his death sentence was reduced to seven years' time for his kidnapping conviction, previously served.

In his book, In the Line of Fire, President of Pakistan Pervez Musharraf stated that Sheikh may have been an agent of MI6, and at some point may have become a double agent.

On March 10, 2007, Khalid Sheikh Mohammed claimed responsibility, before his Combatant Status Review Tribunal at Guantanamo Bay, for the murder of Daniel Pearl. He is an alleged Al Qaeda operative reported to be third in command under Osama bin Laden, mastermind of the 2001 attacks. He claimed to have beheaded Pearl. In a confession read during his Tribunal hearing, Khalid Sheikh Mohammed said, "I decapitated with my blessed right hand the head of the American Jew Daniel Pearl, in the city of Karachi, Pakistan." This confession repeated word for word the phrasing leaked in 2002 from his interrogation at a CIA black site interrogation center.

On March 19, 2007, Ahmed Omar Saeed Sheikh's lawyers cited Khalid Sheikh Mohammed's confession as part of an appeal in defense of their client. They said they had always acknowledged that their client played a role in Pearl's murder, but they had argued that Khalid Sheikh Mohammed was the actual murderer. They plan to feature Mohammed's confession as central in their appeal of their client's death sentence.

According to an investigative report published in January 2011 by Georgetown University, the Federal Bureau of Investigation used vein matching to determine that the perpetrator in the video of the killing of Pearl was most likely Mohammed, identifying him through a "bulging vein" running across his hand that was visible in the video. Federal officials had been concerned that Mohammed's confession obtained through waterboarding would not hold up in court. They intended to use this forensic evidence to bolster their case that he had murdered Pearl.

A Pakistani official announced on March 19, 2013, that another suspect was captured in connection with Pearl's murder and was in police custody. Pakistan's Inter Services Public Relations Directorate confirmed the arrest by a paramilitary unit known as the Pakistan Rangers.

On April 24, 2019, Pakistan arrested the last suspect involved in the murder, named Azam Jan. Azam Jan had eluded the authorities for two decades and was responsible for several terrorist attacks inside Pakistan.

Court proceedings 2020/2021 
On April 2, 2020, The High Court of Pakistan's Southern Province of Sindh vacated the 2007 murder conviction of Omar Said Sheikh and his three co-conspirators (i.e., Fahad Nasim Ahmed, Syed Salman Saqib and Sheikh Mohammad Adil). The High Court reduced their sentences to a 7-year prison term for kidnapping that was counted as time served. At the time, Omar Sheikh had been awaiting the death penalty and his co-conspirators were serving life sentences.

On April 3, 2020,  Pakistani government authorities ordered the detention of the four men set to be released, and stated that they will challenge the vacated case and hold the men on a measure that allows the government to hold terrorism suspects for up to three months (which has been repeatedly extended). 
On May 2, 2020, the parents of Daniel Pearl filed an appeal to the Pakistani Supreme Court to reverse the April 2 decision of the Sindh High Court that overturned the convictions of four men in Pearl's case. They hired Pakistani attorney, Faisal Siddiqi to represent them.

In making their appeal, Daniel's father, Judea Pearl said "We are standing up for justice not only for our son, but for all our dear friends in Pakistan so they can live in a society free of violence and terror and raise their children in peace and harmony."

On July 1, 2020, Pakistan's Supreme Court refused to overturn the lower court's ruling vacating the sentence of Sheikh for the kidnapping and murder of Pearl.

On September 28, 2020, Pakistan's Supreme Court accepted the appeal by the family of Daniel Pearl seeking to keep a British-born Pakistani man (Omar Sheikh) on death row over the beheading of the Wall Street Journal reporter, and to uphold the life sentences of his three co-co-conspirators.

On December 24, 2020, A Pakistani court ordered the release of four men being held over the 2002 abduction and killing of the American journalist Daniel Pearl, arguing that they had time served months ago, and that their continued detention was illegal.

On December 29, 2020, United States Acting Attorney General Jeffrey A. Rosen released a strongly worded statement affirming that if Omar Sheikh and his co-conspirators are not held accountable in Pakistan, "The United States stands ready to take custody of Omar Sheikh to stand trial here. We cannot allow him to evade justice for his role in Daniel Pearl's abduction and murder." Former Governor Chris Christie confirmed that a federal grand jury in New Jersey indicted Omar Sheikh and his co-conspirators for the kidnapping and murder of Daniel Pearl on March 14, 2002, under his tenure as U.S. Attorney for the state of New Jersey.

On January 28, 2021, Pakistan's Supreme Court dismissed an appeal against the vacated sentence of Ahmed Omar Saeed Sheikh in connection with the kidnapping and beheading of journalist Daniel Pearl. The court also ordered that three other Pakistanis who were sentenced to life in prison for their part in Pearl's kidnapping and death, should also be freed. In a statement, Pearl's family called the decision "illegal and unfair" and said they would appeal the decision. At her daily briefing, White House Press Secretary, Jen Psaki expressed outrage at the verdict and asked Pakistan to review all of its legal options, including possible extradition to the United States. The US Secretary of State, Antony Blinken issued a statement declaring that the "US is committed to securing justice for Daniel Pearl's family and holding terrorists accountable."

On January 30, 2021, The Pakistani government decided to formally join the Sindh High Court's review petition against the Supreme Court judgment on the acquittal of all accused persons involved in the abduction and murder of Daniel Pearl. Govt will file move application for the constitution of larger bench to hear review petition.

On February 2, 2021, the Supreme Court ordered Omar Sheikh (the alleged mastermind of Pearl's abduction and beheading) off death row and moved to a so-called government safe house. Sheikh had been on death row for 18 years, but will be under guard and is not allowed to leave said facility. However, Sheikh is permitted visits from his wife and children.

On March 8, 2021, authorities in Karachi sent Omar Saeed Sheikh (who's sentence was reduced to time served of 7 years for murdering American journalist Daniel Pearl) to a rest house within the premises of Kot Lakhpat Jail. He is expected to remain there while the rest of the appeal process plays out in the Supreme Court of Pakistan.

Legacy
A collection of Pearl's writings (At Home in the World) was published posthumously in 2002. The Wall Street Journal noted that these demonstrated his "extraordinary skill as a writer" and his "eye for quirky stories—many of which appeared in The Wall Street Journal "middle column".

The Daniel Pearl Foundation was formed by Pearl's parents Ruth and Judea Pearl; other family and friends have joined to continue Pearl's mission. They intend to carry out the work in the spirit, style, and principles that shaped Pearl's work and character. Daniel Pearl World Music Days has been held worldwide since 2002, and has promoted over 1,500 concerts in over 60 countries.

Pearl's widow, Mariane Pearl, wrote the memoir A Mighty Heart, which tells the full story of Pearl and more about his life. The book was adapted into a film starring Dan Futterman as Daniel Pearl, Angelina Jolie as Mariane Pearl, Irfan Khan, Adnan Siddiqui, Archie Panjabi, and Will Patton.

On September 1, 2003, a book titled Who Killed Daniel Pearl? was published, written by Bernard-Henri Lévy. The book, which the author characterized as an "investigative novel", stirred controversy for some of its speculative conclusions about the killing, for some of its characterizations of Pakistan, and for the author's decision to engage in an exercise of fictionalizing Pearl's thoughts in the final moments of his life. Lévy was criticized for the book. At one point there were plans for a film adaptation of the book, to be directed by Tod Williams and star Josh Lucas, focusing on the last few days of Daniel Pearl's life.

HBO Films produced a 79-minute documentary titled The Journalist and the Jihadi: The Murder of Daniel Pearl. It premiered on HBO on October 10, 2006. The documentary chronicles Pearl's life and death, and features extensive interviews with his immediate family. It is narrated by Christiane Amanpour, and was nominated for two Emmy Awards.

Pearl's parents edited and published a collection of responses sent to them from around the globe, entitled I Am Jewish: Personal Reflections Inspired by the Last Words of Daniel Pearl (Jewish Lights Publishing, 2004). At one point on the video, Pearl said: "My father is Jewish, my mother is Jewish, I am Jewish", after which Pearl added one obscure detail, that a street in Israel's Bnei Brak is named after his great grandfather, who was one of the founders of the town. The family has written that it understands this last detail authenticates Daniel's own voice and demonstrates his willingness to claim his identity. Judea Pearl has written that at first this statement surprised him, but he later understood it to be a reference to the town-building tradition of his family contrasted with the destructive aims of his captors. Judea Pearl then enlarged the idea by inviting responses from artists, government leaders, authors, journalists, scientists, scholars, rabbis, and others. All wrote personal responses to what they thought upon hearing that these were Pearl's last words. Some responses were one sentence while others were several pages.

The book is organized by five themes: Identity; Heritage; Covenant, Chosenness, and Faith; Humanity and Ethnicity; Tikkun Olam (Repairing the World) and Justice. Contributors include Theodore Bikel, Alan Dershowitz, Kirk Douglas, Ruth Bader Ginsburg, Larry King, Amos Oz, Shimon Peres, Daniel Schorr, Elie Wiesel, Peter Yarrow, and A.B. Yehoshua.

In western Massachusetts, where Pearl had been a young journalist, friend and former bandmate, Todd Mack, established a new nonprofit organization, Fodfest, later renamed, Music in Common, to continue Pearl's legacy of "bridge building", Mack said.

Posthumous recognition

In 2002, Pearl posthumously received the Elijah Parish Lovejoy Award from Colby College and in 2007, the Lyndon Baines Johnson Moral Courage Award from the Houston Holocaust Museum.

On April 16, 2007, Pearl was added to the Holocaust Memorial on Miami Beach as the first non-Holocaust victim. His father gave his consent for the induction in order to remind generations to come that "The forces of barbarity and evil are still active in our world. The Holocaust didn't finish in 1945." Journalist Bradley Burston criticized the addition of a post-Holocaust victim to the memorial, saying "it diminishes the uniqueness of the Holocaust".

In 2010, the International Press Institute named Pearl one of its World Press Freedom Heroes.

On December 10, 2007, President George W. Bush and Laura Bush invited Ruth and Judea Pearl, parents of Daniel Pearl, to the White House Hanukkah reception. They lighted the Pearl family menorah that once belonged to Daniel's great-grandparents, Chaim and Rosa Pearl, who brought it with them when they moved from Poland to Mandatory Palestine in 1924. There they helped establish the town of Bnei Brak.

The late former mayor of New York City Ed Koch requested that his own tombstone be inscribed with Pearl's words: "My father is Jewish, my mother is Jewish, I am Jewish."

Films
The Journalist and the Jihadi: The Murder of Daniel Pearl (2006) a television documentary by Indian directors Ahmed Alauddin Jamal and Ramesh Sharma which aired on HBO compares the contrasting lives of Sheikh and Danel Pearl. In 2007, the film A Mighty Heart was released, based on Mariane Pearl's memoir of the same name. Omerta, an Indian biographical film based on the life of Sheikh was released in 2017 and received positive reviews.

Music
American minimalist composer Steve Reich wrote his 2006 work Daniel Variations, jointly commissioned by the Daniel Pearl Foundation and the Barbican Centre, which interweaves Pearl's own words with verses from the Book of Daniel.

Institutions and awards in Pearl's name
Shortly after Pearl's death, his parents founded the Daniel Pearl Foundation. The foundation's mission is to promote cross-cultural understanding through journalism, music, and dialogue. The honorary board of the Daniel Pearl Foundation includes Christiane Amanpour, former US President Bill Clinton, Abdul Sattar Edhi, John L. Hennessy, Ted Koppel, Queen Noor of Jordan, Sari Nusseibeh, Mariane Pearl, Itzhak Perlman, and Elie Wiesel.

The Daniel Pearl Memorial Lecture at UCLA was established by the foundation in 2002. Christopher Hitchens delivered a lecture on March 3, 2010. Other lecturers have included Anderson Cooper, David Brooks, Ted Koppel, Larry King, Jeff Greenfield, Daniel Schorr, and Thomas Friedman. Soka University of America's student news magazine, titled the Pearl, is named in honor of Daniel Pearl. The 2021 Daniel Pearl Memorial Lecture will be given on February 2, 2021, by CNN's lead Washington correspondent Jake Tapper

On May 19, 2010, U.S. President Barack Obama signed the Daniel Pearl Freedom of the Press Act, which protects U.S. journalists around the world. The act is also designed to use tools from the Secretary of State to ensure that freedom of press is upheld in other countries.

In 2010, Moment established The Daniel Pearl Investigative Journalism Initiative to provide grants and mentors for independent journalists to conduct in-depth reporting on anti-Semitism and other prejudices. The edited stories are published in Moment. The project has already produced two stories that have been nominated for the prestigious Livingston Award—the equivalent of the Pulitzer for journalists under 35.

Institutions named after Pearl
The Sammy Ofer School of Communications at IDC Herzliya introduced the Daniel Pearl International Journalism Institute, a new partnership between IDC Herzliya and the Daniel Pearl Foundation. The multimedia newsroom at the School of Communications was named in honor of Daniel Pearl.
The Charles E. Smith Jewish Day School in Rockville, MD has named their gymnasium after Pearl, with a large block sign reading Daniel Pearl Memorial Gymnasium. The school annually celebrates a Daniel Pearl Day.

Awards
In 2005, The Wall Street Journal, in conjunction with the École de Journalisme de Sciences Po, gave the first Daniel Pearl Prize to Louis-Étienne Vigneault-Dubois from Canada, at a ceremony held on June 10 in Paris.
In western Massachusetts, with help from the newspapers there for which Pearl worked early in his career (the North Adams Transcript and the Berkshire Eagle), friends of Pearl established the Daniel Pearl Berkshire Scholarship, awarded annually beginning in 2003.
Since 2003, Stanford's Department of Communication has awarded a paid summer internship with The Wall Street Journal, known as the "Daniel Pearl Journalism Internship."
In 2008 the International Consortium of Investigative Journalists' bi-annual ICIJ awards were renamed the Daniel Pearl Awards for Outstanding International Investigative Reporting.
The Samuel Eells Literary and Educational Foundation annually awards the Brother Daniel Pearl Stanford 85' Award for Literary Excellence to one undergraduate member of the Alpha Delta Phi Society or Fraternity who has displayed exceptional skill and enthusiasm in fiction, non-fiction, poetry, music and lyrics, photography, or film.

Schools named after Pearl
In May 2007, the Communications Technology Magnet School at Birmingham High School in Los Angeles was renamed the Daniel Pearl Magnet High School. In July 2009, it became a stand-alone high school in the Los Angeles Unified School District.
In East Brunswick Township, Temple B'nai Shalom renamed their Hebrew School 'The Daniel Pearl Education Center' after Pearl. Additionally, the Synagogue has created a "Daniel Pearl Education Scholarship".

See also

 2006 Fox journalists kidnapping
 History of the Jews in Los Angeles
 Islamic terrorism
 List of kidnappings
 List of solved missing person cases
 List of unsolved murders

People involved in similar kidnappings/murders 

 Eugene Armstrong
 Nick Berg
 Kenneth Bigley
 Amjad Hussain Farooqi
 James Foley
 Jack Hensley
 Margaret Hassan
 Paul Marshall Johnson Jr.
 Seif Adnan Kanaan
 Shosei Koda
 Yevgeny Rodionov
 Piotr Stańczak
 Kim Sun-il
 Austin Tice

Notes

References

Sources
 – 'Fahad Naseem, one of the three militants accused of kidnapping Pearl, told a judge in Karachi yesterday that Pearl was kidnapped because he was "a Jew and is working against Islam."'
 – 'The intelligence official, who spoke on condition of anonymity, said that information from American intelligence agencies helped Pakistani investigators track down the ring involved in the plot. Information from Khalid Shaikh Mohammed, Al Qaeda's former head of operations who was captured in March 2002, aided the investigation, he said. American officials say they believe that Mr. Mohammed was the person who actually killed Mr. Pearl.'

Further reading
Lévy, Bernard-Henri, Who Killed Daniel Pearl?, Melville House Publishing, 2003. 
Pearl, Daniel, At Home in the World: Collected Writings from the Wall Street Journal, New York: Free Press, June 2002. 
Pearl, Mariane, and Sarah Crichton, A Mighty Heart: The Brave Life and Death of My Husband, Danny Pearl, New York: Scribner, 2003. 
Pearl, Ruth and Judea, eds. I Am Jewish: Personal Reflections Inspired by the Last Words of Daniel Pearl . Jewish Lights Pub., January 2004. .

External links

Daniel Pearl International Journalism Institute, IDC Herzliya
Daniel Pearl Berkshire Scholarship
DANIEL PEARL AWARD - Ecole de journalisme de Sciences Po
Pakistan re-arrests four men acquitted in Daniel Pearl murder case

The Daniel Pearl Foundation
Daniel Pearl at the Rewards for Justice Program
South Asian Journalists Association Roundup
Wall Street Journal selection of stories by Daniel Pearl

1963 births
2000s missing person cases
2002 murders in Pakistan
2002 deaths
2002 murders in Asia
20th-century American journalists
21st-century American journalists
20th-century American Jews
21st-century American Jews
American male journalists
American expatriates in India
American expatriates in the United Kingdom
American people murdered abroad
American people of Iraqi-Jewish descent
American people of Israeli descent
American people of Polish-Jewish descent
American terrorism victims
Antisemitic attacks and incidents
Assassinated American journalists
Birmingham High School alumni
Burials at Mount Sinai Memorial Park Cemetery
Elijah Parish Lovejoy Award recipients
Filmed assassinations
Filmed killings
Formerly missing people
Foreign hostages in Pakistan
Islamism-related beheadings
Jewish American journalists
Jewish martyrs
Journalists from California
Journalists from New Jersey
Journalists killed in Pakistan
Journalists who died as a result of terrorism
Kidnapped American people
Male murder victims
Missing person cases in Pakistan
American Mizrahi Jews
Murdered American Jews
People from Princeton, New Jersey
People murdered in Karachi
Stanford University alumni
Terrorism deaths in Pakistan
The Indianapolis Star people
The Wall Street Journal people
Unsolved murders in Pakistan
Writers from Los Angeles
Beheading videos
Filmed killings in Asia
Filmed executions in Pakistan